Dörpen is a municipality in the Emsland district, in Lower Saxony, Germany. Dörpen is the seat of the Samtgemeinde Dörpen.

References

Emsland